Xie Yuyuan (April 19, 1924 – March 27, 2021) was a Chinese pharmaceutical chemist. He was an academician of the Chinese Academy of Sciences.

Biography
Xie was born in Beijing, on April 19, 1924, while his ancestral home was in Suzhou, Jiangsu. In his early years, he studied in the Department of Chemical Engineering of Soochow University. After the Second Sino-Japanese War in 1945, he was admitted to the Department of Chemistry, Tsinghua University. After graduating in 1949, he taught at the university. In 1951, he was dispatched to the Shanghai institute of Organic Chemistry, Chinese Academy of Sciences. He joined the Communist Party of China in 1956. In 1957, he was sent abroad to study at Russian Academy of Sciences at the expense of the government. He returned to China in September 1993 and continued to work at the Shanghai institute of Organic Chemistry. On March 27, 2021, he died in Shanghai, aged 96.

Honours and awards
 1982 State Natural Science Award (Second Class) 
 1991 Member of the Chinese Academy of Sciences (CAS)

References

1924 births
2021 deaths
Scientists from Beijing
Soochow University (Suzhou) alumni
Tsinghua University alumni
Academic staff of Tsinghua University
Members of the Chinese Academy of Sciences